Oberdachstetten station is a railway station in the municipality of Oberdachstetten, located in the district of Ansbach in Middle Franconia, Germany.

References

Railway stations in Bavaria
Buildings and structures in Ansbach (district)